Estelle Etterre (sometimes billed as Belle Hare; July 26, 1899 – March 7, 1996) was an American actress. She appeared in many early 1930s Hal Roach films, such as the Laurel and Hardy short films County Hospital, The Chimp (both 1932) and Our Relations (1936). She also had minor parts in Our Gang short films Free Eats, Choo-Choo!, The Pooch, Forgotten Babies and Free Wheeling. She later appeared in the Abbott and Costello film In The Navy and her last film was The Manchurian Candidate (1962).

Personal life
Estelle Etterre was born on July 26, 1899, in San Francisco, California. Her father was William Howard Frederick and her mother Carrie May Case. 

On June 3, 1920, she married Josef Werner Makk Jr. in Los Angeles. On February 22, 1925, Makk had died and by 1940 Etterre was earning $2,500 per year. She married again on April 3, 1943, to Donald Hyde Clough in Los Angeles, they later divorced.

Filmography

Film
In all her films she only took minor roles, many of which she was not credited for

[*] Credited as Belle Hare

Television
 The George Burns and Gracie Allen Show (1954)
 It's a Great Life (1955)
 Leave It to Beaver (1961)
 The Lucy Show  (1964)

References

External links
 
 
 

1899 births
1996 deaths
American film actresses
American television actresses
Actresses from San Francisco
Actresses from Newport Beach, California
Hal Roach Studios actors
Burials at Forest Lawn Memorial Park (Glendale)
Our Gang
20th-century American actresses